Sir Denison Samuel King Miller , (8 March 1860 – 6 June 1923) was the first governor of the Commonwealth Bank of Australia.

Early life
Miller was born at Fairy Meadow, near Wollongong, New South Wales, the son of Samuel King Miller, head teacher at the Deniliquin public school and his wife Sarah Isabella, née Jones. He completed his education there.

Career
At 16 years of age, Miller entered the service of the Bank of New South Wales at Deniliquin (1876), and six years later was transferred at his own request to the head office at Sydney. Miller became an accountant in 1896, and four years later, assistant to the general manager. In 1909 he was appointed metropolitan inspector.

In 1911 the federal Labour party decided to bring in a bill to establish a national bank. Miller was summoned to Melbourne (then federal capital) to see the prime minister, Andrew Fisher. The bill was discussed and Miller was asked to become the first governor on a salary of £4000 a year; significantly more than the salary of the prime minister. The appointment was somewhat surprising, Miller relatively unknown, and Queenslander W. V. Ralston had been confidently spoken of, but inquiries must have been made which satisfied Fisher that Miller was a man with the knowledge, courage and caution, required for the office. His appointment was dated 1 June 1912, and in July the bank's business was started in a small room in Collins Street, Melbourne, the staff consisting of Miller, and a messenger lent by the department of the treasury. The sole capital was £10,000 advanced by the government. The first step was the establishment of a savings bank department, which was followed by the opening of the general banking department on 20 January 1913. On the opening day over £2,000,000 was received in deposits, the greater part being Commonwealth government accounts.

Miller began his work as governor with great soundness and caution. It was essential that the public should have complete faith in the new venture, and he was careful to avoid competition with the established banks which might be considered unfair. In the first year progress was comparatively slow though steady, but the bank soon began to expand, and when World War I came in August 1914 it was in a position to do its most important work. In the uncertain early days of the war it made advances to the government, and it took complete charge of the issue of war loans in Australia. Before the war had ended £190,000,000 had been subscribed. The government took control of the primary products of Australia, and the control of the issuing of new capital by public companies. In the transactions which consequently arose Miller's advice and the resources of the bank were always at the service of the various governments, and were sources of great strength to them. By the end of the war the bank was firmly established, with its head office at Sydney, about 40 branches, and 2758 agencies and receiving offices in Australia, the islands, and London.

Late life and legacy

After World War I the bank was able to be of great use in connection with repatriation, and in 1920 it was given control of the Australian note issue. Miller was an indefatigable worker until his unexpected death from heart disease in Sydney on 6 June 1923. He was buried in Waverley Cemetery.

Miller married in 1895 Laura Constance, daughter of Dr J. T. Heeley, who survived him with four sons and two daughters. He was created K.C.M.G. in 1920. A Denison Miller memorial scholarship was founded in his memory at the University of Sydney. He was interested in various charities, and was a founder and for some time honorary treasurer of the New South Wales Institute of Bankers. He advocated a strong immigration policy after the war, and had great confidence in the future of Australia in spite of the war debt. After his death, profits from the note issue continued to bring large sums to the consolidated revenue, and the combined capital and reserves of the bank in 1940 were approaching £10,000,000, all built up out of profits.

References
 

Additional sources listed by the Australian Dictionary of Biography:
C. C. Faulkner, The Commonwealth Bank of Australia (Sydney, 1923); R. Gollan, The Commonwealth Bank of Australia (Canberra, 1968); Parliamentary Debates (Commonwealth), 1924, 106, p 985; Reserve Bank of Australia Archives, Head office, Sydney

1860 births
1923 deaths
Australian bankers
Australian Knights Commander of the Order of St Michael and St George
Burials at Waverley Cemetery
People from Deniliquin